The Michigan Wolverines men's tennis team represents the University of Michigan in National Collegiate Athletics Association (NCAA) Division I competition. College men's tennis became a varsity sport at the University of Michigan in 1893.

History
Adam Steinberg has been the head coach since 2014. The team plays its home matches at the University of Michigan Varsity Tennis Center. The program won its only national title in 1957.  Joel Ross was captain of the tennis team, and was Big Ten singles champion in 1971. 

On March 3, 2022, Michigan defeated the No. 1 ranked TCU Horned Frogs. This marked the first time since rankings were introduced in 1996–97 that Michigan has defeated the No. 1 ranked team.

References

External links